Stanley Howard Shoveller MC (2 September 1881 – 24 February 1959) was a field hockey player, who won a gold medal with the England team at the 1908 Summer Olympics in London. Twelve years later, when Antwerp hosted the 1920 Summer Olympics, he once again won the gold medal with the Great Britain and Ireland squad, at age 39.

Shoveller played his club hockey for Hampstead & Westminster. He was known as "the Prince of centre forwards" and "the immortal centre" for his prolific goal scoring – it's been estimated to be 'well over 500', remarkable in an era of 4-2-3-1 and sweepers.

In World War I, he was awarded an MC for his service with the Rifle Brigade.

References

External links
 

1881 births
1959 deaths
British Army personnel of World War I
English male field hockey players
English Olympic medallists
Olympic field hockey players of Great Britain
British male field hockey players
Field hockey players at the 1908 Summer Olympics
Field hockey players at the 1920 Summer Olympics
Olympic gold medallists for Great Britain
Olympic medalists in field hockey
People educated at Kingston Grammar School
Recipients of the Military Cross
Rifle Brigade officers
Medalists at the 1920 Summer Olympics
Medalists at the 1908 Summer Olympics
Hampstead & Westminster Hockey Club players